Acoetes (via ) was the name of four men in Greek and Roman mythology.
 Acoetes, a fisherman who helped the god Bacchus.
 Acoetes, father to the Trojan priest Laocoön, who warned about the Trojan Horse. As the brother of Anchises, he was therefore the son of King Capys of Dardania and Themiste, daughter of King Ilus of Troad.
 Acoetes, an aged man who was the former squire Evander in Arcadia, before the latter emigrated to Italy.
 Acoetes, a soldier in the army of the Seven against Thebes. When this army fought the Thebes for the first time on the plain, a fierce battle took place at the gates of the city. During these fights Agreus, from Calydon, cut off the arm of the Theban Phegeus. The severed limb fell to the ground while the hand still held the sword. Acoetes, who came forward, was so terrified of that arm that he hit it with his own sword.

See also

Notes

References 
 Gaius Julius Hyginus, Fabulae from The Myths of Hyginus translated and edited by Mary Grant. University of Kansas Publications in Humanistic Studies. Online version at the Topos Text Project.
 Publius Papinius Statius, The Thebaid translated by John Henry Mozley. Loeb Classical Library Volumes. Cambridge, MA, Harvard University Press; London, William Heinemann Ltd. 1928. Online version at the Topos Text Project.
 Publius Papinius Statius, The Thebaid. Vol I–II. John Henry Mozley. London: William Heinemann; New York: G.P. Putnam's Sons. 1928. Latin text available at the Perseus Digital Library.
 Publius Vergilius Maro, Aeneid. Theodore C. Williams. trans. Boston. Houghton Mifflin Co. 1910. Online version at the Perseus Digital Library.
 Publius Vergilius Maro, Bucolics, Aeneid, and Georgics. J. B. Greenough. Boston. Ginn & Co. 1900. Latin text available at the Perseus Digital Library.

Trojans
Characters in the Aeneid
Characters in Roman mythology